Östersund Arena, currently known as Jämtkraft Arena for sponsorship reasons, is a football stadium in Östersund, Sweden. Its current capacity is 8,466 and it was opened on 13 July 2007.

The official tenants are Östersunds FK and Östersunds DFF, but many other football clubs in the area regularly play there.

One of its most famous visitors was  Arsenal Football Club. On February 15, 2018, they defeated Östersunds FK by 3-0 in the first-leg of the Europa League's Round of 32. It was the English club's first trip to Sweden since beating AIK Fotboll in the 1999–2000 UEFA Champions League.

References

External links

Football venues in Sweden
Sport in Östersund
2007 establishments in Sweden
Sports venues completed in 2007
Buildings and structures in Jämtland County
Östersunds FK
CONIFA World Football Cup stadiums